The 2022–23 LIU Sharks men's ice hockey season was the 3rd season of play for the program. The Sharks represented Long Island University and were coached by Brett Riley, in his 3rd season.

Season
LIU entered the season hoping to continue its upward trend, however, they would first have to contend with a major obstacle. More than half of the roster changed in the offseason, including most of the leading scorers. 18 new players were brought in to fill in the gaps with about a third transferring from other programs. The lack of familiarity showed early in the year when the offense had trouble getting on track. In its first 10 games, the Sharks scored just 23 goals and lost 8 of those contests. Excluding the game against Stonehill, who were playing their first game as an equal Division I member, Long Island could barely generate any offense and well out of it just a month into the season. Evan a surprise tie with Quinnipiac didn't do much to improve the team's outlook.

The situation in goal was better, but not by much. Starter Vinnie Purpura was inconsistent during the year but did provide some highlight for the team. His brightest performance came against Ohio State by making 32 saves in the program's first win over a ranked team. That victory came during a 5–2 run, however, because the Sharks were still having to schedule Division II opponents to fill out their schedule, only two of those wins were counted for the national rankings.

The lack of stability on the back end caused LIU to miss several more chances at wins. It got to the point where coach Riley turned to backup Brandon Perrone for help in goal. After changing to goaltender rotation, the Sharks started winning more, however they also began playing some of the worst teams in college hockey. A 5-game winning streak that the team put together in January and February came with four of those games being played against the two newest Division I teams, Stonehill and Lindenwood. The Sharks were able to post a win over tournament hopeful Alaska, but the team ended up stumbling to the finish with a 2–7 skid.

Departures

Recruiting

Roster

|}

Standings

Schedule and results

|-
!colspan=12 style=";" | Regular Season

Scoring statistics

Goaltending statistics

Rankings

Note: USCHO did not release a poll in weeks 1, 13, or 26.

References

2022-23
LIU Sharks
LIU Sharks
2023 in sports in New York (state)
2022 in sports in New York (state)